Getin Noble Bank is a Polish banking and financial services company, formed in Warsaw in 2010 as a result of the merger of Getin Bank SA with Noble Bank SA. Main shareholder is a Polish billionaire Leszek Czarnecki.

Listed on the Warsaw Stock Exchange. It is the 6th largest bank in Poland in terms of the value of assets, and 13th in terms of the number of branches. It offers its clients retail and commercial financing services, investment banking services, asset management, and private banking services.

Capital group
The Getin Noble Bank group:
 Getin Bank
 Noble Bank
 Open Finance
 Noble Funds TFI
 Noble Securities
 Getin Leasing
 Noble Concierge

Shareholders

References

External links
 Official Website

Companies based in Warsaw
Companies listed on the Warsaw Stock Exchange
Banks established in 2010
Financial services companies of Poland
Polish brands
2010 establishments in Poland